Patrick Page Cortez is an American politician and businessman from the state of Louisiana. A Republican, he has represented the Louisiana State Senate's 23rd district, based in southern Lafayette, since 2012. In 2020, Cortez was unanimously elected Senate President, succeeding term-limited John Alario.

From 2008 until 2012, Cortez represented the 43rd district in the Louisiana House of Representatives. He lives with his wife and two children in Lafayette, where he owns and operates a La-Z-Boy furniture gallery.

References

21st-century American politicians
Living people
Republican Party Louisiana state senators
People from Lafayette Parish, Louisiana
People from Lafayette, Louisiana
University of Louisiana at Lafayette alumni
Year of birth missing (living people)